The gossamer worm (Tomopteris, Neo-Latin from Greek meaning "a cut" + "wing" but taken to mean "fin") is a genus of marine planktonic polychaetes. 
All described species are known to be holoplanktic, meaning that they spend their entire life cycles in the water column.

E. Newton Harvey had noted the unusual yellow bioluminescence occurring from the parapodia. There are very few known marine animals that exhibit yellow luminescence. Many species of plankton are known to display this property of bioluminescence. The mechanisms of this process are not well understood; only that they do not use any of the currently known luciferins.
If disturbed, a few species are known to release bioluminescent particles from their parapodia, though possibly all species of Tomopteris do this. It is thought that this mode is to distract predators, analogous to chaff or flares dispensed from military aircraft during evasive maneuvers.

References 

Polychaete genera
Bioluminescent annelids